Dole pri Krašcah is a settlement to the west of Moravče in central Slovenia. The area is part of the traditional region of Upper Carniola. It is now included with the rest of the Municipality of Moravče in the Central Slovenia Statistical Region.

Name
Dole pri Krašcah was attested in historical sources as Süchadol and Suchadol in 1431, Suchodol in 1444, and Suchodoll in 1470.

References

External links

Dole pri Krašcah on Geopedia

Populated places in the Municipality of Moravče